Tucker XP-57 was the designation of a lightweight fighter which was proposed to the United States Army Air Corps (USAAC) in 1940. Nicknamed the "Peashooter", it was developed by the Tucker Aviation Corporation under Preston Tucker, who later became famous for the Tucker '48 Sedan.

To minimize weight, the aircraft was to have a steel tubular frame with aluminum skin and plywood wings. The inline-8 engine, designed by Harry Miller of Indy 500 racing fame, was to sit behind the pilot in a configuration similar to the P-39 Airacobra. The USAAC ordered an XP-57 prototype. When design was delayed due to financial problems in the company, the contract was allowed to lapse. No production aircraft was built because the USAAC was moving towards larger fighters and had lost interest in the project.

Prototype specifications (XP-57)

See also

References

 
 Tucker Military Factory, XP-57 (Peashooter) Fighter (1940)
 American Combat Planes, Ray Wagner, Third Enlarged Edition, Doubleday, 1982.
 The American Fighter, Enzo Angelucci and Peter Bowers, Orion Books, 1987.

Tucker P-57